Gusman Kyrgyzbayev (born 28 September  1992) is a Kazakh judoka.  As of the end of March 2018, he is currently ranked 7th in the world in under 60 kg division.  He finished 7th at the 2017 world championships.

References

External links
 

1992 births
Living people
Kazakhstani male judoka
21st-century Kazakhstani people